Fait Vernon "Chief" Elkins (August 16, 1899 – August 9, 1966) was an American football player and decathlete. 

Elkins was born in Utica, New York, in 1899. He enrolled at the Haskell Indian School at age 15. He played college football at Haskell (1921-1923), Southeastern State Teachers College, Dallas University, and Nebraska (1926-1927). He held the national decathlon record in 1928 while attending Nebraska. He pulled a tendon that prevented him from competing in the 1928 Summer Olympics.

Elkins also played professional football the National Football League (NFL) as a back for the Frankford Yellow Jackets (1928-1929), Chicago Cardinals (1929), and Cincinnati Reds (1933). He appeared in 20 NFL games, 10 as a starter. 

Elkins died in Philadelphia in 1966.

He was posthumously profiled by Sports Illustrated in 1991 as "among the greatest athletes ever seen in this country — a golden sportsman during sport's golden age."

References

1899 births
1966 deaths
Haskell Indian Nations Fighting Indians football players
Nebraska Cornhuskers football players
Frankford Yellow Jackets players
Chicago Cardinals players
Cincinnati Reds (NFL) players
Players of American football from New York (state)